Arifama and Miniafia (Miniafia Oyan) are dialects of an Oceanic language of Oro Province, Papua New Guinea.

References

Nuclear Papuan Tip languages